The small-scaled wonder gecko (Teratoscincus microlepis) is a species of lizard in the family Sphaerodactylidae. The species is endemic to Western and South Asia.

Geographic range
T. microlepis is found in southeastern Iran, Afghanistan, and southwestern  Pakistan (Balochistan province).

Description

Reproduction
T. microlepis is oviparous.

References

Further reading
Nikolsky AM (1900). "[Two new species of Teratoscincus from eastern Persia]". Annuaire du Musée Zoologique de l'Académie Impériale des Sciences de St.-Pétersbourg 4 (2): 145–147. (Teratoscincus microlepis, new species, pp. 145–146). (Title of article in Russian, text in Latin and Russian).

Teratoscincus
Reptiles of Afghanistan
Reptiles of Iran
Reptiles of Pakistan
Reptiles described in 1900
Taxa named by Alexander Nikolsky